Seron is one of the two settlements created immediately after the Great Flood in Jewish tradition.

Seron may also refer to:

A hole, a rather small hole

 Place
 Serón, a municipality in Andalusia, Spain
 Serón de Nágima, a municipality in Castile and León, Spain
 Séron, a commune in the Hautes-Pyrénées department in south-western France

 Other
 Seron (surname)
Seron, commander of the Syrian army, who fought at the Battle of Beth Horon (166 BC)
 Seron Maxwell, a fictional character in the Japanese light novel adventure series Meg and Seron
 Phyllostylon brasiliensis, a small tropical American tree that yields Santo Domingan boxwood
 Seron or seroon: a hamper or pannier; equally, a bale or parcel wrapped in animal hide